Richard L. Gallo M.D., Ph.D. is a Distinguished Professor and founding Chairman of Dermatology at the University of California, San Diego and Chief of Dermatology at the VA San Diego Healthcare System. His research accomplishments as a physician-scientist include discovery of antimicrobial peptides in mammalian skin, establishing new links between innate immunity and skin diseases such as atopic dermatitis and rosacea, and defining the functions of the skin microbiome in host immune defense.

Education
Gallo did his undergraduate studies at the University of Chicago, earned his MD and PhD at the University of Rochester, interned in Pediatrics at Johns Hopkins Hospital, was a Dermatology resident at Harvard Medical School and was a postdoctoral fellow at Harvard University under the supervision of Merton Bernfield'

Research 
Gallo studies how humans interact with the environment and protect themselves from infection. He discovered that cathelicidin antimicrobial peptides(Cathelicidins) are present during wound repair. Subsequent work from his laboratory used molecular techniques to produce a knock out mouse that has shown how cathelicidin antimicrobials protect against infection in several organs including the skin. By using a wide variety of biochemical and genetic tools his work has also shown that other antimicrobial peptides and elements of innate immunity such as Toll-like receptors and Hyaluronan influence human health. His work has translated into a new understanding of the cause of rosacea, a finding with immediate therapeutic implications. Most recently his research has defined biochemical mechanisms through which Vitamin D and the normal skin microflora Microbiome can control immune responses. These latest findings have advanced understanding of the Hygiene hypothesis, Atopic Dermatitis and Rosacea. His analysis of the function of the human skin microbiome is leading discovery of new therapeutic approaches to disease by discovering molecules from bacteria on the skin that can be used for drugs.

Several press releases and scientific publications have reported his discoveries.

Awards and honors
Gallo has been elected as a fellow of the American Association for the Advancement of Science, the Association of American Physicians, the American Society for Clinical Investigation and the American Society for Microbiology.

References 

Living people
American dermatologists
University of California, San Diego faculty
1958 births